Carlos Rafael do Amaral or simply Amaral (born 28 November 1983, in Mogi Mirim), is a Brazilian defensive midfielder who last played for Passo Fundo in the Campeonato Gaúcho.

Club statistics

Honours
 Brazilian Série C: 2003
 Brazilian Cup: 2005
 Campeonato Brasileiro Série B: 2009

References

External links

  Guardian Stats Centre
  globoesporte.globo.com
 
  netvasco.com.br
  crvascodagama.com
  CBF
  ntevasco statistics

1983 births
Living people
Brazilian footballers
Paulista Futebol Clube players
Ituano FC players
CR Vasco da Gama players
Grêmio Foot-Ball Porto Alegrense players
Cerezo Osaka players
J1 League players
Expatriate footballers in Japan
América Futebol Clube (MG) players
Cruzeiro Esporte Clube players
Botafogo de Futebol e Regatas players
Criciúma Esporte Clube players
Ceará Sporting Club players
Campeonato Brasileiro Série A players
Campeonato Brasileiro Série B players
Association football midfielders
People from Mogi Mirim